Cody of the Pony Express is a 1950 American Western serial film directed by Spencer Gordon Bennet. It starred Jock Mahoney, Dickie Moore, Peggy Stewart and William Fawcett.

Plot
The plot centers  on a young Cody joining forces with the Lieutenant Jim Archer to battle an outlaw gang  secretly headed by Mortimer Black, an unscrupulous lawyer who is tempted by greed into a series of crimes leading to murder.

Cast
 Jock Mahoney as Lt. Jim Archer (as Jock O'Mahoney)
 Dickie Moore as Bill Cody
 Peggy Stewart as Linda Graham
 William Fawcett as Erza Graham
 Tom London as Doc Laramie
 Helena Dare as Ma Graham
 George J. Lewis as Mortimer Black
 Pierce Lyden as Slim Randall [Chs.4-15]
 Jack Ingram as Pecos [Chs.1-7]
 Rick Vallin as Henchman Denver [Chs.1-4]
 Frank Ellis as Durk - Henchman [Chs.1,2,4,8-10,12-15]
 Ross Elliott as Irv - Henchman
 Ben Corbett as Henchman Eric Mason 
 Rusty Wescoatt as Denver - Hired Gunman [Ch.14]

Production
Cody of the Pony Express was filmed on locations in Pioneertown, California.

Cody of the Pony Express was the last serial with a boy in the title role (in this case as the young Buffalo Bill/William F. Cody).

Chapter titles
 Cody Carries the Mail
 Captured by Indians
 Cody Saves a Life
 Cody Follows a Trail
 Cody to the Rescue
 The Fatal Arrow
 Cody Gets His Man
 Renegade Raiders
 Frontier Law
 Cody Tempts Fate
 Trouble at Silver Gap
 Cody Comes Through
 Marshal of Nugget City
 Unseen Danger
 Cody's Last Ride
Source:

References

External links

Cinefania.com

1950 films
1950s English-language films
American black-and-white films
1950 Western (genre) films
Columbia Pictures film serials
Films directed by Spencer Gordon Bennet
Works about the Pony Express
American Western (genre) films
Cultural depictions of Buffalo Bill
Films with screenplays by George H. Plympton
Films with screenplays by Joseph F. Poland
1950s American films